Barrington Edward "Barry" Hayles (born 17 May 1972) is a football player and coach who plays as a striker for Windsor. He began his career in the Spartan League with Willesden Hawkeye before playing for Stevenage Borough, Bristol Rovers, Fulham, Sheffield United, Millwall, Plymouth Argyle, Leicester City, Cheltenham Town, St Albans City, Arlesey Town, three separate spells at Truro City, Chesham United, and Windsor. Born in England, he was capped ten times by Jamaica at international level.

Club career

Willesden Hawkeye, Stevenage Borough
Hayles was born in Lambeth, South London. After beginning his career with Willesden Hawkeye in the early 1990s, he joined Isthmian League Premier Division side Stevenage Borough in February 1994, and impressed with the club in his first two seasons there. He was part of the team which won the Football Conference in the 1995–96 season, however when the club were denied promotion to the Football League he became interested in a move away from Broadhall Way. In 1997, after continuing to impress with Stevenage Borough, he earned a move to Football League club Bristol Rovers.

Bristol Rovers
Hayles impressed immediately, scoring on his debut against Plymouth Argyle with a first half header, and went on to top the Division Two scoring chart in his first season with 23 league goals as Rovers narrowly lost 4–3 on aggregate to Northampton Town in the playoffs. After beginning the 1998–99 season brightly, Hayles earned a £2 million pound move to Fulham.

Fulham
Hayles made over 200 appearances during his spell at Fulham, scoring 44 league goals and helping them to two promotions. He was integral to the team that got promoted to the Premier League for the first time in their history in 2001. Highlights during his time in the Premier League included scoring an equaliser against rivals Chelsea, a brace in a 2–0 win over Everton and another brace as Fulham memorably beat Tottenham Hotspur 3–0 at White Hart Lane. During his time at Fulham he was also called up for international duty for Jamaica.

Sheffield United
Hayles was released on a free transfer joining Sheffield United. His spell with the Blades was not a success and he moved to Millwall for a nominal fee two months later.

Millwall
Hayles signed for Millwall aged 32, making over 50 league appearances and scoring 16 goals during his two-year spell at the club.
In the 2004–05 season he notably scored in the local derby against West Ham and a hat trick away at Derby County helping Millwall to finish 10th

Plymouth Argyle
Hayles was signed by Plymouth Argyle by new manager Ian Holloway for a fee of £100,000 prior to the 2006/2007 season, where he quickly established himself as a supporters' favourite after a hugely impressive start which earned him the nickname "The Ox in the box". He made his Plymouth Argyle debut against Wolverhampton Wanderers, where he also scored his first goal for his new club. He has a record of never being on a losing side when scoring for Argyle (14 goals, 7 wins and 7 draws) up to Saturday 28 April 2007. In the 2007–08 season, Hayles planned to leave Plymouth at the end of the season.

Leicester City
On 31 December 2007, Hayles joined Leicester City on an emergency loan, which became permanent for a fee of £150,000 on 2 January, signing an 18-month contract. He made his debut in a 3–1 away defeat to Queens Park Rangers on 1 January, and scored his first goal in a 2–0 win over Coventry City on 12 January, Hayles scored his second and last goal for the club in a 1–0 win over Crystal Palace on 28 January. Leicester was relegated from the Championship at the end of the season.

On 12 August 2008, Hayles joined Cheltenham Town on loan for a month, which was extended for a further month on 11 September. He re-joined Cheltenham on loan for another month 27 November. Hayles had a brief run in the Leicester first team upon his return, but failed to score a single goal. He nonetheless earned a medal on 24 April after the club finished the season as League One champions. Hayles was released at the end of his contract on 29 May.

Cheltenham Town
On 13 July 2009, Hayles joined Cheltenham Town full-time. After making more than 50 league appearances for the Robins, he was released along with seven other players in May 2010.

Truro City
Hayles signed with Southern League Premier Division club Truro City on 18 September 2010. He made his debut three days later against Bideford in the Southern League Cup. He scored his first goal for the club on 9 October 2010 in a 6–0 win against Halesowen Town as City went joint top of the Premier Division table. Having scored two goals in his first month at Treyew Road, Hayles extended his stay for another month. "Barry has settled in fantastically well and has been a great boost for the squad and the club," said Lee Hodges, the manager of Truro City and a teammate of the striker during his time at Plymouth Argyle. "I am absolutely delighted that he is staying" Hodges added. Hayles scored a hat-trick in the top of the table clash between Salisbury City and Truro City on 22 February 2011 in a result that Truro City won 6–0, Salisbury's first home defeat of the 2010–11 Southern League Premier Division season.

St Albans City
Hayles agreed to join Southern League Premier Division side St Albans City at the start of the 2012–13 season after leaving Truro City due to the club's financial problems. However, he returned to Truro on a non-contract basis on 14 December 2012, the same day that the club was sold to new owners.

Arlesey Town
On 24 July 2013, Hayles signed for Arlesey Town after he had scored twice in the first half of their 6–0 friendly win over Langford the previous evening.

Truro City
In August 2014, Hayles re-signed for Truro City and opened his scoring in his second game of the season, scoring both goals in the 2–1 win at Paulton Rovers. That season he helped them reach the Conference South via the play-offs and was again released at the age of 43.

Chesham United
On 26 June 2015, Chesham United announced they had signed Hayles as a player-coach. Chesham United manager Andy Lees stated, "He has a lot to offer on the pitch still and now off it as well as he looks to start a coaching career.". In Chesham United's 1–0 win at Bristol Rovers in the FA Cup on 8 November 2015, Hayles came on as a substitute, receiving an ovation from both sets of supporters.

Windsor
Hayles joined Hellenic League Premier Division side Windsor for a similar role in July 2017.

Merstham
After two years with Windsor, Hayles joined Merstham as assistant manager ahead of the 2019–20 season. He was also registered as a player, and made his début for the club as a second-half substitute in a 4–0 win at Wingate & Finchley.

Following Merstham's relegation from the Isthmian League Premier Division in 2022, Hayles, along with manager Frank Wilson, departed the club.

Windsor
In July 2022, Hayles returned to Windsor as a member of new manager Mick Woodham's backroom staff, the club refusing to rule out the possibility of him playing for the club again. He made his second début for the club on 16 August, playing 81 minutes in a 3–2 defeat at Harefield United.

International career
Hayles was called up to the Cayman Islands squad in 2000 for a pair of FIFA World Cup qualifying matches against Cuba. He took part in an unofficial 5–0 friendly defeat to American club side D.C. United, but he never played for them in a full international after FIFA ruled that he did not meet eligibility requirements.

Hayles has played at least ten times for Jamaica, making his debut against Cuba on 10 June 2001. Although he never announced his retirement from international football, the national team has not called him up since 2005.

Whilst at Stevenage Borough, Hayles played twice for the England Non League Team at that time (now England C Team). The first game was in May 1995 at St Albans FC against the Scottish Highland Football League who beat the England Non League Team 3–2. The second game was again against the Scottish Highland Football League at Cove Rangers FC (three mile south of Aberdeen) in May 1997. This time the England Non League Side won 5–0 with Hayles scoring two goals, and Lee Hughes of Kidderminster Harriers at that time, scoring another two goals.

Career statistics

Honours
Stevenage Borough
Isthmian League Premier Division: 1993–94
Football Conference: 1995–96

Fulham
Second Division: 1998–99
First Division: 2000–01
UEFA Intertoto Cup: 2002

Leicester City
League One: 2008–09

Truro City
Southern League Premier Division: 2010–11
Southern League Premier Division Play-off: 2014–15

References

External links

Barry Hayles Official Website at Icons.com

1972 births
Living people
Footballers from Lambeth
Association football forwards
Jamaican footballers
England semi-pro international footballers
Jamaica international footballers
Stevenage F.C. players
Bristol Rovers F.C. players
Fulham F.C. players
Sheffield United F.C. players
Millwall F.C. players
Plymouth Argyle F.C. players
Leicester City F.C. players
Cheltenham Town F.C. players
Truro City F.C. players
St Albans City F.C. players
Arlesey Town F.C. players
Chesham United F.C. players
Windsor F.C. players
Merstham F.C. players
English Football League players
Premier League players
National League (English football) players
Southern Football League players
People educated at Archbishop Tenison's Church of England School, Lambeth
Player-coaches